Merry Christmas is an album by Caspar Brötzmann and F.M. Einheit, released in April 1994 through Our Choice.

Track listing

Accolades

Personnel 
Musicians
Caspar Brötzmann – guitar, production, cover art
F.M. Einheit – bass guitar, keyboards, percussion, production
Production and additional personnel
Dave Burton – cover art
Bruno Gebhard – engineering
Ingo Krauss – engineering
Dirk Rudolph – cover art

References

External links 
 

1994 albums
Caspar Brötzmann albums